Miri Marriott Resort & Spa is the first and only international five star hotel in Miri, Malaysia as of April 2009.

Background 
Miri Marriott Resort & Spa was formerly RIHGA Royal Hotel Miri. The resort was opened in 2005 following an extensive renovation of its guestrooms, food and beverage outlets and other public areas before being rebranded a Marriott resort. It is the sixth Marriott branded hotel in Malaysia.

Facilities 
The modern 5-story resort hotel is situated on a 20-acres land at Brighton Beach, facing the South China Sea. The hotel is equipped with 8,208 sq ft of meeting rooms that capable of holding 720 people.

See also
Marriott International
Marriott Hotels
Marriott India

External links
Miri Marriott Resort & Spa

References

Hotels in Malaysia
Marriott hotels
Miri, Malaysia
Hotels established in 2005
Hotel buildings completed in 2005